Karl Altenburger (27 August 1909 – 2 February 1978) was a German racing cyclist. He rode in the 1931 Tour de France.

References

External links
 

1909 births
1978 deaths
German male cyclists
Place of birth missing
Tour de Suisse stage winners
People from Altenburg
Cyclists from Thuringia
20th-century German people